Iziegbe (Izzy) Odigie (born 1996) is a New York born Nigerian afrobeats choreographer. In 2019, she was one of OkayAfrica's "100 women".

Life 
Odigie was born in 1996; her mother, Osarenoma Odigie, was a nurse and her father was a businessman. She was born in Brooklyn but brought up in Nigeria in Edo State. where she went to boarding school She moved to the US in 2007 and studied dance and attended St. John’s University in Queens, New York. She was one of the founders of the Trybe dancers who appeared accompanying afrobeats artists.

She is known for Afro dance; she came to notice when she danced with Eddy Kenzo in 2015 reaching 20 million via a video.

She was chosen to be on the OkayAfrica 100 women list in 2019. The 2019 emphasis was to find women who were disrupting their own local culture whilst at the same time demanding equal access to the global stage.

Odigie teaches dance and tours. She has worked with the artists like Tiwa Savage, Mr Eazi, Moonchild Sanelly and Yemi Alade.

In 2020 she choreographed and appeared in one episode of the fifth series of the Fox US drama, Empire.

References 

1996 births
Living people
People from Brooklyn
American choreographers
Nigerian choreographers